This Christmas (I'd Rather Have Love) is the fourteenth and final studio album by American singer Teddy Pendergrass. It was released by Surefire Records on September 15, 1998. Upon release, the album debuted at number 83 on the US Top R&B/Hip-Hop Albums chart. In 2010, it peaked at number 43 on the Top Holiday Albums chart.

Critical reception

AllMusic reviewer Marvin Jolly wrote that "Pendergrass' smoldering vocals make This Christmas (I'd Rather Have Love) one of the most romantic seasonal records on the market."

Track listing

Charts

References

1998 Christmas albums
Teddy Pendergrass albums
Rhythm and blues Christmas albums